Shantel Rivard was hired in 2002 as the first coach for the University of North Dakota's Fighting Sioux women's hockey team. Rivard's contract was not renewed beyond the 2006–2007 season, and she was replaced in December 2006.

Career
1997–2000 Maine Black Bears women's ice hockey program - assistant coach
2001 University of Maine - associate coach 
2002–2006 North Dakota Fighting Sioux women's ice hockey program - head coach

External links
Shantel Rivard bio at fightingsioux.com

North Dakota Fighting Hawks women's ice hockey coaches
Living people
Year of birth missing (living people)